Andre Agassi was the defending champion, but David Nalbandian defeated him 6–2, 6–3, in the final.

Players

Draw

Main draw

Play-offs

External links
Official Commonwealth Bank International website
2004 Commonwealth Bank International results

Kooyong Classic
Com